Rafael Concepción (born 24 June 1982) is a boxer from the Republic of Panama, nicknamed "El Torito". He has a record of 13 wins, 4 losses and 1 draw.

He fought A. J. "Bazooka" Banal of the Philippines for the WBA interim Super Flyweight Title on July 26, 2008 which he came out the victor. Though trailing in points, Concepcion sent Banal to the canvass in the 10th round. Due to exhaustion, his opponent refuse to rise back and continue.

On his first defense of the crown, Concepcion took on former world title holder Jorge Arce on September 15 that same year. After a vicious exchange of punches, he conceded the match and the title at the end of the 9th round.

He faced Nonito Donaire on August 15, 2009 in the Hard Rock Hotel in Las Vegas, Nevada to regain the same title he lost which has become vacant. On the weigh-in, however, Concepcion was more than 4 pounds overweight and could not go lower on time. Thus the title became only available for Donaire who successfully made the weight limit. Concepcion lost the bout via unanimous decision. From there, Concepcion moved to bantamweight.

References

External links

1982 births
Living people
Southpaw boxers
Super-flyweight boxers
Panamanian male boxers
Sportspeople from Panama City